Touro University California is a private graduate school focused primarily on health professions and located on Mare Island in Vallejo, California. It is part of the Touro College and University System and is jointly administered with its sister campus Touro University Nevada.

The university was founded in 1997 and was originally established in San Francisco as an independent, Jewish-sponsored institution, but relocated to Vallejo. Today, the university confers degrees in graduate studies of various disciplines including education, osteopathic medicine, pharmacy, physician assistant studies, nursing, and public health. Although sponsored by a Jewish organization, the school has a diverse student body of about 1,400 students as well as 100 faculty members.

History
Established in 1997, Touro University California was originally located in San Francisco with its inaugural class composed of 67 students. In 1999, officials decided to relocate to the southern area of Mare Island due to its large capacity and restored two naval quarters buildings originally built in the 1930s and had the lease option to renovate ten other buildings intended to become diagnostic and research laboratories. Touro University California's main buildings are Farragut Inn, named in honor of Commander David G. Farragut, Wilderman Hall in honor of Commander Alvin Wilderman, and Lander Hall named in honor of Dr. Bernard Lander, the founder of the Touro College system. After Western University of Health Sciences' College of Osteopathic Medicine of the Pacific received accreditation in 1982, Touro University California's College of Osteopathic Medicine became the second osteopathic medical school program to open in the state of California.

Academics

The colleges of Touro University California include the College of Osteopathic Medicine which offers the Doctor of Osteopathic Medicine (D.O.) degree, the College of Pharmacy which offers the degree of Doctor of Pharmacy (Pharm.D.), the College of Education and Health Studies which offers three types of degrees, including a Master of Arts in Education, a Physician Assistant degree currently offered as a dual degree (MSPAS/MPH), and a  Master of Public Health (M.P.H.) degree. Additionally, students may pursue dual degrees such as D.O./M.P.H. or Pharm.D./M.P.H. Since 2010, Touro University California has offered the Master of Science in Medical Health Science degree (MSMHS) which provides specific training towards the preparation for the College of Osteopathic Medicine. In contrast, the Master of Science in Medical Health Sciences degree with emphasis in research in pharmaceutical sciences is now offered with the aim of preparing students for the College of Pharmacy. Tuition for full-time students in 2012 was $43,090. The World Directory of Medical Schools lists the College of Osteopathic Medicine as a US medical school along with other accredited US M.D. and D.O. programs.

Research
Faculty members of Touro University California's Colleges of Osteopathic Medicine and Pharmacy specialize in a wide range of basic and applied research in fields including: aging, anatomy and clinical imaging, cognitive aging, diabetes, immunology, infectious diseases, ion channels, longevity, neuroscience, metabolism/nutrition, and vaccine research. Touro University California has established research partnerships with University of California, San Francisco, University of California, Davis, University of California, Berkeley, Hebrew University of Jerusalem, Showa University, and University of Sao Paulo. Research at Touro University California is funded by the American Diabetes Association, the Bill & Melinda Gates Foundation, and the National Institutes of Health.

Accreditation

Student life

Touro University California also sponsors the Touro Student-Run Free Clinic, an interprofessional free clinic organized and staffed by student volunteers. The student-run free clinic was designed to improve access to healthcare for low-income Vallejo residents and to further improve the clinical skills of Touro University California students.  A licensed clinician provides direct, on-site supervision. Touro University California students also volunteer at the Suitcase Clinic in Berkeley, California, a clinic that offers free health and social services to the underserved of the area. The College of Osteopathic Medicine hosts an active chapter of Sigma Sigma Phi, a national Osteopathic Medicine Honors Fraternity that emphasizes community service and scholastic achievement.

Each year, Touro University California hosts the Teen Life Conference to educate Vallejo high school students on matters of health with lectures, health screenings, informational booths, and interactive physical fitness activities to foster student participation.

Notable faculty
 Walter Hartwig
 Jean-Marc Schwarz

See also
Medical schools in California

References

External links

Schools accredited by the Western Association of Schools and Colleges
Touro University California
Osteopathic medical schools in the United States
Pharmacy schools in California
Schools of public health in the United States
Educational institutions established in 1997
Medical schools in California
Mare Island
Schools in Vallejo, California
1997 establishments in California
Private universities and colleges in California